Venko Filipče (Macedonian: Венко Филипче, born 13 June 1977) is a Macedonian neurosurgeon and the former health minister of North Macedonia from 2017 to 2022. He served as the health minister during the COVID-19 pandemic in North Macedonia. In addition to his work as a surgeon and health minister, Filipče has also published scientific articles in medical neurosurgical journals.

Early life and education 
Venko Filipče was born on 13 June 1977 in Skopje. He is the son of Ilija Filipče, a Macedonian doctor and a professor, who served as the minister of health of the Republic of Macedonia in the period between 1994 and 1997. Venko Filipče finished his high school in Skopje in 1995. He obtained his diploma from the Medical faculty of Ss. Cyril and Methodius University of Skopje in 2001 and became an assistant in 2004. His specialization in neurosurgery started in 2003 and finished in 2008. Filipče obtained his Master's degree in neurosurgery in 2011 and his doctor's thesis, titled "Evaluation of adequate timing for the treatment of ruptured intracranial aneurysms" in 2015.

In addition to his PhD, Filipče also studied for a year at Ohio State University and Dayton Ohio in the field of neurosurgery. He also received training in endovascular techniques in neurosurgery at medical centers in Ljubljana, Istanbul, Zürich, Graz and Belgrade. In 2012, he obtained a fellowship in interventional neuroradiology.

Career 

Filipče has published several scientific studies as the leading author in a variety of neurosurgical journals. He serves as the Secretary of the Macedonian Neurosurgical Association and the Association of Neurosurgeons of Southeastern Europe.

Before starting his mandate as the health minister of North Macedonia in December 2017, Filipče was a health counselor to prime minister Zoran Zaev and worked as a professor at the Medical Faculty in Skopje. He is a pioneer in the field of neurovascular techniques used in the treatment of vascular anomalies in the brain.

Filipče served as the Health Minister during the COVID-19 pandemic in North Macedonia, which gave him a lot of exposure during his frequent public appearances and press conferences.

On 10 September 2021, following a fire incident at a modular COVID unit in Tetovo in which 14 patients lost their lives, Filipče announced a written resignation to the PM due to "moral reasons".

Personal life
Filipče is married and has one son.

List of published articles

References

External links 
 

1977 births
Living people
Macedonian neurosurgeons
21st-century Macedonian politicians
Health ministers of North Macedonia
Ss. Cyril and Methodius University of Skopje alumni
Politicians from Skopje